Abutilon megapotamicum or Callianthe megapotamica (trailing abutilon) is a species of Abutilon native to Argentina, Brazil and Uruguay.

It is a popular ornamental plant in subtropical gardens. They bloom for months from summer to frost, and they decorate the plant with a profusion of blossoms resembling Chinese lanterns.

They are also known as flowering maple, Chinese lantern and parlour maple, in addition to trailing abutilon.

References
 LORENZI, H.; SOUZA, M.S. (2001) Plantas Ornamentais no Brasil: arbustivas, herbáceas e trepadeiras Plantarum 

megapotamicum
Flora of Brazil